Nicholas James Melvoin (born 1985) is an American attorney, former teacher, and adjunct professor serving as member of the Los Angeles Unified School District Board of Education for District 4 since May 16, 2017. A member of the Democratic Party, Melvoin is the second youngest member of the board after Kelly Gonez, with the two supporting charter schools during their tenures in the Board of Education. He is currently a candidate for California's 30th congressional district in the 2024 election to succeed Adam Schiff.

Early life and education 
Melvoin was born in Brentwood, Los Angeles to television writer Jeff Melvoin and photojournalist Martha Hartnett Melvoin, and is the older brother of Charles "Charlie" Melvoin. He graduated from Harvard-Westlake School in 2004 and from Harvard University in 2008, earning a Master's degree from Loyola Marymount University and a Juris Doctor from the New York University School of Law.

Career

Teaching and clerk career
Melvoin started teaching at Edwin Markham Middle School through the Teach For America program and had served as a legal clerk for the American Civil Liberties Union. He was also the director of policy, communications and associate counsel for Great Public Schools Now and a consultant to Educators 4 Excellence and Teach Plus. After his first year at Markham Middle School, he was laid off along with 70% of teachers due to budget cuts. Melvoin worked on the ACLU’s  Reed v. California lawsuit, which challenged LAUSD’s seniority-based teacher layoff policies, as well as testifying in the Vergara v. California lawsuit.

Board of Education 

In 2016, Melvoin announced that he would be a candidate for the Los Angeles Unified School District Board of Education for District 4, held by member and Vice President of the Board Steve Zimmer. Melvoin said he ran because he realized that there "was a lot outside my classroom that was affecting what was happening inside." The race was joined by candidates Allison Holdorff Polhill and Greg Martayan. On February 23, 2017, all four candidates debated on the role of charter schools, undocumented students, and the budget for the District at a UCLA forum.

Melvoin and Zimmer competed in a runoff after the general election where Polhill and Martayan were eliminated. Melvoin was endorsed by the Daily Breeze, the Los Angeles Daily News, the Los Angeles Times, and HuffPost. Melvoin's campaign was criticized for receiving significant third-party spending support to defeat Zimmer, including the Walton family who spent more than $5 million for his campaign. The election itself was also criticized for being what was believed to be the most expensive school board election in U.S. history.

On May 17, 2017, Zimmer conceded to Melvoin in the race during a speech to his supporters, calling it devastating while saying that he would never run for office again. Melvoin won with against Zimmer by fourteen points, and with his win, Melvoin replaced Zimmer as a board member for District 4 as well as the board's vice president. After the election, the charter-backed candidates, including Melvoin, had a majority on the Board of Education.

During the 2019 Los Angeles Unified School District teachers' strike, Melvoin said that the District couldn't afford the teacher's demands. In 2019, Melvoin announced that he would seek re-election, and was endorsed by Teamsters Local 572 in his successful campaign. He won re-election against two other candidates with nearly 60% of the vote. With the Board election, the teacher's union candidates won back control of the Board, and in 2023, Melvoin was replaced by Scott Schmerelson as the vice president of the Board of Education.

Congress 
In 2023, Melvoin announced that he would run for California's 30th congressional district, an open seat vacated by incumbent Adam Schiff's run for Senate. He stated that he believed that his young age would match the voters' "desire for new blood and new vision."

Electoral history

References 

1985 births
21st-century American politicians
California Democrats
School board members in California
Living people
21st-century American Jews
Harvard University alumni
Loyola Marymount University alumni
New York University School of Law alumni
Teach For America alumni
Candidates in the 2024 United States House of Representatives elections